Diethylaluminum cyanide ("Nagata's reagent") is the organoaluminum compound with formula ((C2H5)2AlCN)n.  This colorless compound is usually handled as a solution in toluene.  It is a reagent for the hydrocyanation of α,β-unsaturated ketones.

Synthesis 
Diethylaluminum cyanide was originally generated by treatment of triethylaluminum with a slight excess of hydrogen cyanide. The product is typically stored in ampoules because it is highly toxic. It dissolves in toluene, benzene, hexane and isopropyl ether.  It undergoes hydrolysis readily and is not compatible with protic solvents.

Et3Al + HCN   →  1/n (Et2AlCN)n   + EtH

Structure 
Diethylaluminum cyanide has not been examined by X-ray crystallography, although other diorganoaluminum cyanides have been.  Diorganylaluminum cyanides have the general formula (R2AlCN)n, and they exist as cyclic trimers (n = 3) or tetramers (n = 4).  In these oligomers, one finds AlCN---Al linkages.  One compound similar to diethylaluminum cyanide is bis[di(trimethylsilyl)methyl]aluminium cyanide, ((Me3Si)2CH)2AlCN, which has been shown crystallographically to exist as a trimer with the following structure:

Bis(tert-butyl)aluminium cyanide, tBu2AlCN exists as a tetramer in the crystalline phase:

Uses 
Diethylaluminum cyanide is used for the stoichiometric hydrocyanation of α,β-unsaturated ketones.  The reaction is influenced by the basicity of the solvent.  This effect arises from the Lewis acidic qualities of the reagent.
The purpose of this reaction is to generate alkylnitriles, which are precursors to amines, amides, carboxylic acids esters and aldehydes.

References

External links

Cyanides
Organoaluminium compounds